Gulabrao Deokar is an Indian politician belonging to the Nationalist Congress Party (NCP). He was member of the Maharashtra Legislative Assembly and served the minister for Urban Transport of Maharashtra State.

Jalgaon housing scam 
In 2019, Dule District Court sentenced Devkar five years of imprisonment in the 110 crore Jalgaon housing scam case. He was a member of the Jalgaon Municipal Corporation during this major fraud.

References

Maharashtra politicians
Nationalist Congress Party politicians from Maharashtra
People from Jalgaon district
Marathi politicians
Year of birth missing (living people)
Living people
People convicted of corruption
Prisoners and detainees of Maharashtra
Indian politicians convicted of corruption